Lydia Mounia Miraoui (born 24 September 1991) is a  footballer who plays as a midfielder. Born in France, she represents Algeria at international level.

Career

At club level 
Miraoui started her career in the age of 8 by Football Club des Ecureuils d'Arlac and joined five year later 2004 in the age of 13, to Olympique Lyon. In Lyon She was called 2006 in OL's Reserve team of the Feminin Honneur Ligue – Phase Unique Reserve team squad. Miraoui won with the club 2006/2007 the league was promoted with Lyon's reserve team to the Division 2 Féminine. Miraoui made her professional debut for Olympique Lyonnais Féminin in the Division 1 Féminine on 24 May 2009 in 14:1 win over Stade Saint Brieuc, after sub in minute 58 for Simone Gomes Jatobá. She made 3 appearances in two years for the Senior side of Lyon and was than transferred to Spanish side UE L'Estartit. In summer 2011 Miraoui signed for SC Freiburg in Germany's Frauen Bundesliga, for Olympique Lyon and played 13 games for them in the 2011/2012 season. After the Season left Europe and signed for Algerian Women's Championship for ASE Alger Centre, before returned in summer 2014 to France to sign with Claix Football. Than signed in Summer 2015 for AS Nancy and a year later returned to Merignac, who signed for FCE Mérignac Arlac.

International 
The midfielder is an Algerian international, she took part in the 2010 African Championship and 2014 African Women's Championship in Namibia.

References

1991 births
Living people
People from Maubeuge
Sportspeople from Nord (French department)
Footballers from Hauts-de-France
Algerian women's footballers
Algeria women's international footballers
French women's footballers
Expatriate women's footballers in Spain
Expatriate women's footballers in Germany
Algerian expatriate sportspeople in Spain
Algerian expatriate sportspeople in Germany
French expatriate sportspeople in Spain
French expatriate sportspeople in Germany
Olympique Lyonnais Féminin players
SC Freiburg (women) players
UE L'Estartit players
Women's association football midfielders
French sportspeople of Algerian descent
Division 1 Féminine players